Fort la Bouque (commonly referred by locals as Labouc) is one of three colonial forts in Fort-Liberté Arrondissement in the Nord-Est Department of Haiti. There are three other forts on the eastern edge of the channel: Batterie de l'Anse, Fort Saint Charles and Fort Saint Frédérique, one of which is known locally as Fort-Lachatre.  Labouc sits northeasterly at the narrow tip separating the Atlantic Ocean and the Bay of Fort-Liberté and adjacent to a vast area of land northwesterly. The area occupied by Labouc and the land adjacent known as ESSO by locals form part of larger makeup of the bay.

References

External links
 Google Map interactive tour of Fort la Bouque

Bouque
Military history of Haiti